Zack Bryant (born November 24, 1997) is an American professional basketball player who last played for Czarni Słupsk of the Polish Basketball League (PLK). He played college basketball for UAB and Georgia Southern.

Early life and high school career
Bryant grew up in Hastings, Florida and played basketball and football. He attended Pedro Menendez High School for two seasons, and led the team to a district title in 2017. Bryant moved to Jacksonville, Florida to attend the Providence School prior to his junior year. He averaged 20.1 points and 5.9 assists per game as a senior, helping lead the team to a state runner-up finish. Bryant was named The Florida Times-Union's First Coast player of the year in 2017. Two of his brothers played football in college and Bryant was recruited to play college football as well. He committed to play basketball at UAB, the first school to offer him a scholarship, over Clemson, Georgia and Iowa State.

College career
Bryant averaged 16.6 points, 3.2 rebounds, and 3.6 assists per game as a freshman, earning Conference USA All-Freshman Team honors. On January 26, 2019, he scored a career-high 30 points along with five rebounds and three assists in an 89–86 victory over Rice. As a sophomore, Bryant averaged 14.9 points, 3.9 assists, 3.5 rebounds, and 1.8 steals per game. He was named to the Third Team All-Conference USA. Bryant played three games during his junior season, averaging 11.0 points, 2.0 rebounds and 2.6 assists per game. He was dismissed from the team on November 18, 2019. Bryant transferred to Georgia Southern and sat out most of the 2019–20 season. He considered transferring after coach Mark Byington left to coach James Madison, but was persuaded to stay after new coach Brian Burg developed a relationship with him. As a senior, Bryant averaged 13.6 points, 2.6 rebounds, 2.6 assists and 1.2 steals per game.

Professional career
On July 5, 2021, Bryant signed his first professional contract with BG Göttingen of the Basketball Bundesliga.

On November 30, 2021, it was announced that Bryant had signed with the Finnish team Lahti Basketball of the Korisliiga.

On February 2, 2022, he has signed with Acqua S.Bernardo Cantù of the Serie A2

On September 1, 2022, he has signed with Czarni Słupsk of the Polish Basketball League (PLK).

References

External links
Georgia Southern Eagles bio
UAB Blazers bio

1997 births
Living people
American men's basketball players
Basketball players from Florida
BG Göttingen players
Czarni Słupsk players
Georgia Southern Eagles men's basketball players
People from St. Johns County, Florida
Pallacanestro Cantù players
Point guards
UAB Blazers men's basketball players